Edwin Randall may refer to:

 Edwin M. Randall (1822–1895), Florida lawyer and Republican politician
 Edwin M. Randall Jr., American Methodist minister
 Edwin J. Randall (1869–1962), bishop of the Episcopal Church